Gustavo "Chavo" Díaz Domínguez (born 7 November 1974) is a Uruguayan former football manager and former player who played as a defender. He is the current manager of River Plate Montevideo.

References

External links
 
Liga MX Profile 
Gustavo Díaz at Soccerway

1974 births
Living people
Uruguayan footballers
Uruguayan expatriate footballers
Association football defenders
Uruguayan football managers
Liga MX managers
Real Valladolid players
Club Atlético River Plate (Montevideo) players
Segunda División players
Expatriate footballers in Spain
Expatriate football managers in Chile
Expatriate football managers in Bolivia
Expatriate football managers in Mexico
Expatriate football managers in Paraguay
River Plate Montevideo managers
C.D. Universidad Católica del Ecuador managers
Defensor Sporting managers
Club Blooming managers
Club Guaraní managers
Club Nacional de Football managers